Elena Remizova (born 22 September 1986) is a Russian visually impaired Paralympic skier who won three gold and one silver medal at the 2014 Winter Paralympics. She won her first gold medal in women's 15 km classic skiing in Sochi, Russia in 2014.

References

Living people
1986 births
Russian female biathletes
Russian female cross-country skiers
Cross-country skiers at the 2014 Winter Paralympics
Biathletes at the 2014 Winter Paralympics
Paralympic gold medalists for Russia
Paralympic silver medalists for Russia
Medalists at the 2014 Winter Paralympics
Russian blind people
Paralympic medalists in cross-country skiing
Paralympic cross-country skiers of Russia
20th-century Russian women
21st-century Russian women
People from Kurgan Oblast